The 1939 Iowa State Cyclones football team represented Iowa State College of Agricultural and Mechanic Arts (later renamed Iowa State University) in the Big Six Conference during the 1939 college football season. In their third season under head coach James J. Yeager, the Cyclones compiled a 2–7 record (1–4 against conference opponents), tied for fourth place in the conference, and were outscored by opponents by a combined total of 117 to 50. They played their home games at Clyde Williams Field in Ames, Iowa.

Marty Boswell was the team captain. Center Jack West was selected as a first-team all-conference player.

Schedule

References

Iowa State
Iowa State Cyclones football seasons
Iowa State Cyclones football